Lucky Pierrot is a Japanese chain of hamburger fast food restaurants founded in 1987. The company operates 17 stores in Hakodate, Hokkaido and serves 1.8 million customers per year. Each of its 17 stores has a different theme.

The Nikkei named its Chinese Chicken Burger Japan's "best local hamburger". In 2005, the chain released a hamburger with whale meat.

References

Companies based in Hokkaido
Fast-food chains of Japan
Hakodate
Restaurants established in 1987